Akello is a surname. Notable people with the surname include:
Beatrice Akello Akori), Ugandan politician
Frances Akello (born 1936), Ugandan farmer, educator and former politician
Grace Akello (born 1950), Ugandan poet, essayist, folklorist, and politician
Ibrahim Akello (born 1985), Kenyan former cricketer
Immaculate Akello (born 1996), Ugandan social entrepreneur, climate change activist
Lucy Akello (born 1980), Ugandan social worker and politician
Patricia Akello (born 1992), Ugandan professional model
Rose Lilly Akello (born 1971), Ugandan politician

Surnames of Kenyan origin
Surnames of Ugandan origin